Aphalanthus conradti is a species of beetle in the family Cerambycidae, and the only species in the genus Aphalanthus. It was described by Kolbe in 1894.

References

Stenobiini
Beetles described in 1894